West District is a district in west Chiayi City, Taiwan.

History

The West District was established on 6 October 1990.

Administrative divisions
Since February 1, 2010, West District has been divided into forty-five urban villages:
()
Shuyuan, Yonghe, Xinfu, Wenhua, Xirong, Fanshe, Guohua
()
Daxi, Zhuanyao, Fuquan, Fuan, Xinxi, Gangping, Tougang, Xiping, Liucuo
()
Ziqiang, Meiyuan, Hunei, Shizi, Hongwa, Guanglu, Fumin, Chedian, Chuiyang, Peiyuan, Yuying, Zhiyuan, Cuidai, Daoming
()
Beirong, Qingan, Xianghu, Zhongxing, Houyi, Hubian, Zhuwei
()
Baosheng, Baoan, Beixin, Xincuo, Baofu, Zhucun, Beihu and Xiapi Village.

Government institutions
 Chiayi City Council

Education
 National Chiayi University - Sinmin Campus

Tourist attractions
 Art Site of Chiayi Railway Warehouse
 Chiayi Art Museum
 Chiayi Cultural and Creative Industries Park
 Chia-Le-Fu Night Market
 Museum of Old Taiwan Tiles
 Taiwan Hinoki Museum
 Wenhua Road Night Market

Transportation
 TRA Chiayi Station

Notable natives
 Vincent Siew, Vice President (2008-2012)

See also
 Chiayi City

References

External links
  
 嘉義西市場旳美食-隱藏版-西市米糕 ('Foods in Chiayi's West Market-Secret Edition-West Market's Rice Cake')